Francisco, El Jesuita is a 2015 American four-part television miniseries directed by Matthias Gueilburt and produced by Anima Films. The first episode debuted on Telemundo on September 13, 2015.

Awards

References

External links 
 

2010s American television miniseries
Works about Pope Francis
Telemundo original programming
Television shows based on books
2015 American television series debuts
2015 American television series endings